Breens Intermediate School is located in Bishopdale in Christchurch, New Zealand. It has a roll of approximately 200 students and serves year 7 and 8 students. The principal, Nikki Clarke leads the school, with Nathan Maclennan as the deputy. Established in 1976, Breens Intermediate is located just east of Christchurch International Airport.

Notes

External links
 Breens Intermediate School (official website)

Schools in Christchurch
Intermediate schools in New Zealand